Malcolm "Mike" Thomas (July 17, 1953 – August 23, 2019) was an American football running back in the National Football League (NFL) for six seasons with the Washington Redskins and San Diego Chargers.

Early years
Born in Greenville, Texas, Thomas graduated from Greenville High School in 1971 and played college football at the University of Oklahoma and the University of Nevada Las Vegas. At the time, UNLV was a Division II program; it moved up to Division I-A in 1978. In his senior season in 1974, the Rebels were undefeated in the regular season and advanced to the Division II semifinal (Grantland Rice Bowl).

Playing career
Thomas was selected in the fifth round of the 1975 NFL draft by the Washington Redskins. In his rookie season, he rushed for 919 yards and was named the Associated Press Offensive Rookie of the Year. The following season in 1976, Washington returned to the playoffs as the wild card team; Thomas ran for over 1,100 yards and went to the Pro Bowl.

In his fourth season in 1978 under first-year head coach Jack Pardee, the Redskins won their first six games. Thomas injured his ankle in that sixth game and sat out the next three games.

Thomas was traded to the San Diego Chargers in May 1979. After playing two seasons, he was waived by the Chargers in September 1981.

Personal life
His older brothers Jimmy and Earl Thomas also played in the NFL. 

Thomas died at age 66 on August 23, 2019 at a hospital in Houston after a lengthy illness.

References

External links

 

1953 births
2019 deaths
American football running backs
San Diego Chargers players
UNLV Rebels football players
Washington Redskins players
National Conference Pro Bowl players
National Football League Offensive Rookie of the Year Award winners
People from Greenville, Texas